Vedammal was elected to the Tamil Nadu Legislative Assembly from the Harur constituency, which was reserved for candidates from the Scheduled Castes, in the 1996 elections. She was a candidate of the Dravida Munnetra Kazhagam (DMK) party.

Vedammal is the dmk candidate for 2021 elections.

References 

Tamil Nadu MLAs 1996–2001
Dravida Munnetra Kazhagam politicians
20th-century Indian women politicians
20th-century Indian politicians
Year of birth missing (living people)
Living people
Women members of the Tamil Nadu Legislative Assembly